Early Song is the 1999 studio album by Faun Fables. It was released through the label Drag City.

Track listing
"Muse" - 3:48
"The Crumb" - 3:04
"Old Village Churchyard" - 4:19
"Apple Trees" - 4:42
"Only a Miner" - 2:39
"Sometimes I Pray" - 5:01
"Honey Baby Blues" - 2:20
"Lullaby For Consciousness" - 4:16
"O Death" - 3:42
"Ode to Rejection" - 4:02
"Bliss" - 2:19

External links
Official Faun Fables web site

Faun Fables albums
1999 albums
Drag City (record label) albums